This is a list of international prime ministerial trips made by Giuseppe Conte, who served as the 58th Prime Minister of Italy from 1 June 2018 until 13 February 2021.

Summary of international trips

2018

2019

2020

References 

Conte, Giuseppe
Foreign relations of Italy
Conte, Giuseppe
International